The 2014–15 FC Porto season was the club's 105th competitive season and the 81st consecutive season in the top flight of Portuguese football. For the first time since the 1988–89 season, and the third during the presidency of Jorge Nuno Pinto da Costa, Porto did not win any official competition.

The pre-season began on 3 July 2014 and featured eight preparation matches: four in Portugal (including a presentation match on 27 July against Saint-Étienne) and four abroad, in the Netherlands, Belgium and England.
Porto started the official season on 15 August 2014 with a 2–0 home win against Marítimo for the 2014–15 Primeira Liga. For the first time in nine seasons, the Supertaça Cândido de Oliveira was not Porto's season-opening match, as the club failed to qualify for the 36th edition by not winning the 2013–14 Primeira Liga title or being present in the final of the 2013–14 Taça de Portugal (as Benfica made the double).

Porto also competed in other domestic competitions, such as the Taça de Portugal and the Taça da Liga. Together with the other Primeira Liga teams, they entered the 2014–15 Taça de Portugal in the third round, but were eliminated by Sporting CP after a 3–1 home loss. Beginning their 2014–15 Taça da Liga campaign in the third round, Porto topped their group and qualified for the semi-finals, where they were barred from a third final appearance after losing 2–1 away to Marítimo.

In UEFA competitions, Porto participated in the 2014–15 UEFA Champions League. They reached the group stage for the 19th time after eliminating French side Lille in the play-off round. Porto topped their group and secured qualification for the knockout phase. In the round of 16, they eliminated Basel with an aggregate score of 5–1. In doing so, Porto booked a place in the quarter-finals for the first time since 2008–09, where they faced Bayern Munich. After beating the Germans 3–1 for the first leg, in what was Porto's first-ever home win over Bayern Munich, the team lost the second leg 6–1 and were eliminated with a 7–4 aggregate score. This defeat was their worst ever defeat in UEFA competitions, together with a 6–1 away defeat against AEK Athens in the 1978–79 European Cup.

Players

Squad information

Transfers in

Total expending:   €35.7 million

Transfers out

Total income:  €80.25 million

Technical staff
{| class=wikitable
|-
!Position
!Staff
|-
|Head coach || Julen Lopetegui
|-
|Assistant coach || Julián CaleroJuan Carlos MartínezRui Barros
|-
|Goalkeeping coach || Juan Carlos Arévalo
|-
|Fitness coach || Raul Costa
|-
|Masseur || José Luís
|-
|Nurse || Eduardo BragaJosé Mário Almeida
|-
|Doctor || Nélson PugaJosé Carlos Esteves
|-
|Medical team || Paulo ColaçoPedro Vale
|-
|Director of football || Antero Henrique
|-

Pre-season and friendlies

Competitions

Overall record

Primeira Liga

League table

Results by round

Matches

Taça de Portugal

Third round

Taça da Liga

Third round

Semi-finals

UEFA Champions League

Play-off round

Group stage

Round of 16

Quarter-finals

Statistics

Squad

Goalscorers

Awards

See also
List of FC Porto seasons

References

FC Porto seasons
Porto
Porto